The White Angel is a 1936 American historical drama film directed by William Dieterle and starring Kay Francis, Ian Hunter and Donald Woods. The film depicts Florence Nightingale's pioneering work in nursing during the Crimean War. It was produced and distributed by Hollywood studio Warner Brothers.

Plot
In Victorian England, Florence Nightingale (Kay Francis) decides to become a nurse, puzzling her upper-class family (as nursing was considered a disreputable profession at the time). She travels to Germany to the only nursing school. The training is arduous, but she endures and graduates. When she returns home, however, no one is willing to employ her.

When the Crimean War breaks out, she finally gets her chance. With the help of influential friends and damning newspaper reports on the wretched conditions in the Crimea by Fuller (Ian Hunter), a reporter for The Times, she is permitted to recruit some nurses and lead them to Scutari in Turkey to tend the wounded.

There, however, she is bitterly opposed by Dr. Hunt (Donald Crisp), who is in charge of the hospital. She remains undaunted, and soon wins the love of her patients. Each night, she passes through miles of the wards, carrying a lamp, so she can satisfy herself that her patients have all they need. Her tireless efforts greatly reduce the mortality rate. Her fame is spread by the newspapers, and Henry Wadsworth Longfellow writes a poem in her honor.

When the opportunity arises, she goes to the front to attend the wounded more quickly. She leaves Sister Colomba (Eily Malyon) in charge at Scutari. Once more, Nightingale faces official opposition to her efforts, instigated by Dr. Hunt. However, she gains the support of Lord Raglan (Halliwell Hobbes), the British commander in chief, and is soon hard at work. When she comes down with cholera, she is attended by Tommy (Billy Mauch), a drummer boy she herself nursed back from the brink of death.

While she is only partially recovered, she is surprised when Sister Colomba shows up. The nun informs her that Dr. Hunt replaced her with Ella Stephens, a flighty socialite Nightingale had already rejected as a nurse. Under Stephens' lax and uncaring leadership, conditions had greatly worsened. Nightingale returns to Scutari and sets things straight.

After the war ends, she returns home to England. By this time, even Dr. Hunt has reconsidered his opinion of her work, but his superior, Undersecretary of War Bullock (Montagu Love), remains steadfast in his opposition. Bullock tries to turn Queen Victoria against Nightingale, but the monarch instead shows her approval by presenting Nightingale with a brooch.

Cast
 Kay Francis as Florence Nightingale
 Ian Hunter as Fuller
 Donald Woods as Charles Cooper
 Nigel Bruce as Doctor West
 Donald Crisp as Doctor Hunt
 Henry O'Neill as Doctor Scott, a strong supporter of Nightingale
 Billy Mauch as Tommy
 Charles Croker-King as Mr. Nightingale
 Phoebe Foster as Elizabeth Herbert
 George Curzon as Sidney Herbert
 Georgia Caine as Mrs. Nightingale
 Ara Gerald as Ella Stephens
 Halliwell Hobbes as Lord Raglan
 Eily Malyon as Sister Colomba
 Montagu Love as Bullock
 Ferdinand Munier as Alexis Soyer, a cook who follows Nightingale to Scutari
 Lillian Kemble-Cooper as Parthenope "Parthe" Nightingale (as Lillian Cooper)
 Egon Brecher as Pastor Fliedner
 Tempe Pigott as Mrs. Waters
 Barbara Leonard as Minna
 Frank Conroy as Mr. Le Froy
 Alma Lloyd as nurse
 J. Gunnis Davis as Secretary
 Gardner James as Patient

Reception
According to Warner Bros records the film earned $886,000 in the US and Canada and $530,000 elsewhere.

Writing for The Spectator in 1936, Graham Greene gave the film a poor review, praising Francis' acting, but concluding that "she is defeated by the scenario-writers". Greene points in particular to the graveyard scene which he describes as a "dreadful sequence".

References

External links

 
 
 
 

1936 films
1930s biographical drama films
American biographical drama films
American black-and-white films
Crimean War films
Films about Florence Nightingale
Films directed by William Dieterle
Warner Bros. films
1930s historical drama films
American historical drama films
Films set in the 1850s
Films set in London
Films set in Germany
Cultural depictions of Florence Nightingale
1930s English-language films
1930s American films